The 1999 French Open in badminton was an A-level tournament in the European Circuit held in Paris, from March 17 to March 21, 1999. The prize money was US$10,000.

Venue
Halle Carpentier, Paris, France

Final results

References

French Open (badminton)
Denmark